Great Danger is the fourth and final studio album by American pop-punk band the Audition.

Release
In January 2010, the group supported Every Avenue and Sparks the Rescue on their co-headlining US tour. Following this, the Audition embarked on a headlining tour of the US through to the following month. Great Danger was released through Victory Records on March 16. The first single from the album is the third track, "You Ruined This". Between late May and early July, the group went on tour with Hawthorne Heights. In September, the band went on a co-headlining tour of Australia with You Me at Six, where they were supported by Kids in Glass Houses.

Track listing

References

External links

Great Danger at YouTube (streamed copy where licensed)

The Audition (band) albums
2010 albums
Victory Records albums